Huron Heights Secondary School is a public high school in the York Region District School Board which opened in 1962.  Additions were added in 1965 and 1969. It is located in Newmarket, Ontario, Canada and serves students from the Newmarket and East Gwillimbury area.

The name comes from the First Nation that inhabited the area and the height of land on which the school is located in the northwest part of the town. It also began to share the Newmarket-area enrichment program with Newmarket High School in 2000.

The 2005 student population was approximately 1,850, in grades 9-12. The floor area is approximately 20 900 m².

Feeder schools
Glen Cedar Public School
Meadowbrook Public School
Prince Charles Public School
Mount Albert Public School
Sharon Public School
(Among Others)

Notable alumni
Jeff Beukeboom, former Stanley Cup winning NHL defenseman attended Huron Heights while playing for the Newmarket Flyers of the Ontario Provincial Junior "A" league
Veronica Brenner, a graduate, won a silver medal in freestyle skiing at the 2002 Winter Olympics
Jim Brennan, professional Football (soccer) player, member of the Canadian national team, first player of the Toronto FC franchise, and played in the FA Premier League
Curtis Joseph, long-time NHL goalie
Sam Reid, songwriter producer was the keyboard player for Glass Tiger 
Dhane Smith, professional lacrosse player for the Buffalo Bandits of the NLL
Tyler Stewart of the band Barenaked Ladies attended Huron Heights between 1980 and 1986, and was Head Boy and active in various school bands and the music program.
Matt Sweeney and Travis Stokl, founding members of indie pop band, The Elwins
Corey Watman, professional CFL football player, 2-time Grey Cup champion.
Greg Alsop, professional drummer and member of the band Tokyo Police Club
Peter McGillivray, Operatic Baritone and winner of the 2003 CBC/Radio-Canada Young Performers Award

See also
List of high schools in Ontario
 Arts York
 St. Elizabeth Catholic High School
 Westmount Collegiate Institute
 Unionville High School
 York Region District School Board

References

External links
 Huron Heights Secondary School
 Huron Heights School Council

York Region District School Board
High schools in the Regional Municipality of York
Education in Newmarket, Ontario
1962 establishments in Ontario
Educational institutions established in 1962